University of Liberal Arts Bangladesh (ULAB) is a private liberal arts-based University in Dhanmondi, Dhaka, Bangladesh. Founded in February 2002, permission to open was received from the University Grants Commission (UGC) of Bangladesh in November 2003, pursuant to the Private University Act, 1992. 

ULAB incorporates the values of Liberal Arts and Sustainability into its curricula, through its General Education Department and its Center for Sustainable Development (CSD). ULAB is a research-intensive University, with multiple research opportunities for its faculty members and students. ULAB has its permanent campus in Mohammadpur within an eco-friendly environment providing facilities such as open sports field, library, auditorium, student center, transportation services, interactive court and other necessary amenities. In February 2023, ULAB established two new departments, the Bangla Department and the Literature Department. The university is the first institute of higher education in Bangladesh to teach ethnic minority languages, of which Bangladesh has 44 according to Professor Shameem Reza.

Schools and Degree-Granting Programs (UGC Approved)
ULAB offers degree programs in the following schools:

School of Arts and Humanities
 Bachelor of Arts, English and Humanities, Bangla Language and Literature (Honors)
 Master of Arts in English

School of Social Science
 Bachelor of Social Science, Media Studies and Journalism (Honors)
 Masters in Communication 

School of Business
 Bachelor in Business Administration (Honors)
 Master of Business Administration (MBA)
 Executive Master of Business Administration (EMBA)

School of Science and Engineering
 Bachelor of Science in Computer Science and Engineering (Honors)
 Bachelor of Science in Electronics and Telecommunication Engineering (Honors)
 Bachelor of Science in Electrical and Electronic Engineering (Honors)

ULAB has one non-degree-granting program, which runs the required courses to fulfill a liberal arts curriculum:
 General Education Program (GED)

List of vice-chancellors 
 Imran Rahman (2011 – May 2017)
 HM Jahirul Haque (2017 – 2021)
 Imran Rahman (2 November 2021 – present)

Heads of schools and departments

 School of Business              = Prof. Imran Rahman (Acting Head)
 School of Science and Engineering                      = Prof. M. Mofazzal Hossain, PhD (Dean)
 Department of Electrical and Electronic Engineering                      = Prof. M. Mofazzal Hossain, PhD (Head)
 Department of Computer Science and Engineering                      = Prof. Prof. Syed Akhter Hossain, PhD (Head)
 School of Social Sciences                               = Prof. Jude William R. Genilo, PhD (Dean)
 School of Arts and Humanities                                         = Prof. Kaiser Hamidul Haq, PhD (Dean)
 Department of English Humanities                       = Prof. Arifa Ghani Rahman (Head)
 Bachelor of Business Administration              = Associate Professor Muhammad Faisol Chowdhury, PhD (Director)
 Graduate Business Programs              = Asif Uddin Ahmed (Director)
 General Education Program                            = Prof. Shahnaj Husne Jahan, PhD (Head)

Research centers
ULAB has nine centers that conduct research, run workshops and conferences; promote knowledge creation, and advocate best practices. 
 Center for Sustainable Development (CSD)
 Center for Enterprise and Society (CES)
 Center for Bangla Studies (CBS) (original name: Center for Bangla Language and Literature.)
 Center for Archaeological Studies (CAS) 
Dhaka Translation Center (DTC)  
 Bengal Lights Literary Journal 
 Center for Language Studies (CLS)
 Center for Advanced Theory (CAT)
 Center for Excellence in Teaching and Learning (CETL)

Co-curricular activities 
Clubs are the mainstay of co-curricular life and activities. ULAB is a member of Duke of Edinburgh's Award program.

The Department of Media Studies & Journalism of ULAB also has apprenticeship programs for the students
 CinemaScope 
 ULAB TV, launched on 27 June 2013, is the first campus TV channel in Bangladesh. Its stated purpose is hands-on training in television production and journalism. Run by students, it broadcasts infotainment programs and news bulletins. 
 The ULABian, Student Newspaper 
 ULAB Radio CampBuzz 
 ShutterBugs.ULAB, a campus based photography apprenticeship program.
 PR 4U,a campus-based public relational sectors apprenticeship program.
 Animation Studio.ULAB, a campus based animation apprenticeship program.

Notable people

Faculty 
 Rafiqul Islam
 Kaiser Haq
 Salimullah Khan
 Muhammad Ibrahim
 Imran Rahman
 Azfar Hussain, Scholar-in-Residence, 2016 and 2017
 Mohit Ul Alam, until 2014
 Abdul Mannan
 Syed Manzoorul Islam
 Firoz Mahmud, visual artist and educator, until 2016
 Tahsan, Tahsan Rahman Khan, singer and educator, until 2013

Alumni 
 Bappy Chowdhury, actor, nominated awardee Meril Prothom Alo Awards
 Konal, singer who won the reality show Channel i Shera Kontho reality show in 2009
 Mashiat Rahman, actress
 Masha Islam, multilingual singer

References

External links
Official website
 

2002 establishments in Bangladesh
Educational institutions established in 2002
Universities and colleges in Dhaka